Cross Rhythms was the eponymously titled music magazine, produced by the Christian media organisation of the same name. It was founded under the name Cross Rhythms Magazine by editor Tony Cummings, and printer Mark Golding in April 1989, with the first issue being made available in May 1990. Two years later, publication of the magazine was taken over by Cornerstone House, a publishing company owned by Chris Cole. 

After partnering with Christian radio station United Christian Broadcasters (UCB) in 1995, the magazine was given more financial stability. Around this time, Cross Rhythms had a circulation of approximately 15,000. Around 2000, Cross Rhythms official website was launched, which continued online after the paper magazine ceased publication in the summer of 2005 with its 85th issue. , the website is the sixth most viewed Christian website in the UK.

Cross Rhythms centered almost exclusively on contemporary Christian music, with only the occasional review of more mainstream music. Each issue included interviews with musicians and bands, reviews of various albums and compilations, and features on music festivals or productions. Each issue also included a CD, narrated by Mike Rimmer, containing a selection of the songs featured in the magazine. Later issues featured Edges, a series of commentaries on major issues by communicator Mal Fletcher, and That Mysterious Cross, a series on the Christian cross by Chip Kendall of thebandwithnoname.

References

External links 

Cross Rhythms
Music magazines published in the United Kingdom
Quarterly magazines published in the United Kingdom
Christian magazines
Christian music media
Defunct magazines published in the United Kingdom
Magazines established in 1990
Magazines disestablished in 2005
Mass media in Stoke-on-Trent